Jinduicheng Molybdenum Group Mining Corporation is a Chinese company which is engaged in molybdenum production, sales and manufacturing. This company provides molybdenum charging materials, including roasted molybdenum concrete powder and ferromolybdenum; molybdenum metal products, including molybdenum powder, molybdenum slabs, molybdenum rods and molybdenum wires, among others, as well as molybdenum chemical products, including ammonium molybdate, molybdenum disulfide and molybdenum oxide, among others.

This company is listed on the Shanghai Stock Exchange.

See also
 Tongling Nonferrous Metals
 China Molybdenum

References

Metal companies of China
Companies listed on the Shanghai Stock Exchange
Companies established in 1958
1958 establishments in China